Paul Capdeville was the defending champion.
Thiago Alves won the title by defeating Paolo Lorenzi 6–3, 7–6(7–4) in the final.

Seeds

Draw

Finals

Top half

Bottom half

References
 Main Draw
 Qualifying Draw

Jalisco Open - Singles
2012 Singles